Royalton Township is one of the twelve townships of Fulton County, Ohio, United States. As of the 2010 census the population was 1,515, of whom 953 lived in the unincorporated portions of the township.

Geography
Located in the northern part of the county along the Michigan line, it borders the following townships:
Fairfield Township, Lenawee County, Michigan - north
Ogden Township, Lenawee County, Michigan - northeast corner
Amboy Township - east
Fulton Township - southeast corner
Pike Township - south
Chesterfield Township - west
Seneca Township, Lenawee County, Michigan - northwest corner

The village of Lyons is located in northern Royalton Township.

Name and history
It is the only Royalton Township statewide.

Government
The township is governed by a three-member board of trustees, who are elected in November of odd-numbered years to a four-year term beginning on the following January 1. Two are elected in the year after the presidential election and one is elected in the year before it. There is also an elected township fiscal officer, who serves a four-year term beginning on April 1 of the year after the election, which is held in November of the year before the presidential election. Vacancies in the fiscal officership or on the board of trustees are filled by the remaining trustees.

References

External links
County website

Townships in Fulton County, Ohio
Townships in Ohio